Vriesea altodaserrae is a plant species in the genus Vriesea. This species is endemic to Brazil.

Cultivars 
 Vriesea 'Starlight'

References 

BSI Cultivar Registry Retrieved 11 October 2009

altodaserrae
Flora of Brazil